The 1945–46 United States collegiate men's ice hockey season was the 52nd season of collegiate ice hockey in the United States.

Regular season

Standings

References

1945–46 NCAA Standings

External links
College Hockey Historical Archives

 
College